1116 SEN (call sign 3AK) is an Australian radio station in Victoria. Owned and operated by Pacific Star Network, it broadcasts a sports radio format from Lower Plenty to Greater Melbourne. First broadcast on 29 November 1931 as 3AK, the station currently broadcasts from studios in South Melbourne.

History

The station first broadcast on 29 November 1931 as 3AK. In October 2003, amid growing debt and struggling ratings, 3AK operators Data & Commerce Limited placed the station up for sale. In November, owners Data & Commerce Limited entered into a lease with the newly formed Sports Entertainment Network to create SEN 1116, a 24-hour sports radio station. Headed by managing director Danny Staffieri, formerly of FIVEaa, the new station was promoted as 'entertaining radio with a sports focus', and would rival horse racing station Sport 927.

On 19 January 2004, SEN 1116 launched onto Melbourne's airwaves, with former AFL footballers Garry Lyon, Tim Watson and Billy Brownless heading the station's "Morning Glory" breakfast show, Richmond Football Club premiership player Kevin Bartlett in mornings, ABC Radio National's Francis Leach in afternoons, and Dermott Brereton and Anthony Hudson in drive. In the year's first radio ratings survey, the station jumped from reaching 1.2% of the Melbourne radio market as 3AK, to 2.1% as SEN, growing to 2.8% in the year's fourth survey despite the lack of coverage of any major sports. However, in July, the station secured broadcast rights to the 2004 Summer Olympics, alongside 2GB, 2CC, FIVEaa, 6iX, HO-FM and Hot 100, among others. SEN also carried coverage of the 2004 NRL Grand Final from 2GB, and the 2004–05 FA Premier League from BBC Radio 5 Live.

In December 2004, the SEN brand was revealed to be expanded into Adelaide, with Sports Entertainment Network leasing news talk 5DN from Australian Radio Network to create SEN 1323. Launching on 1 February 2005, the station became a simulcast of its Melbourne sister station, with only one Adelaide-based programme - "The Boys Next Door", hosted by former FIVEaa presenter Mark Aiston, The Sunday Footy Show panelist Mark Bickley and Port Adelaide Football Club ruckman Matthew Primus. However, while the station remained flat in Melbourne, ratings dwindled in Adelaide; despite gaining coverage of the New Zealand cricket tour of Australia and the 2005 VFL season, Sports Entertainment Network entered voluntary administration, citing $3.5 million in losses. The SEN 1323 lease was cancelled, resulting in ARN launching easy listening-format Cruise 1323. The Melbourne station was sold back to Pacific Star Network, the renamed Data & Commerce Limited.

2010s
In July 2015, the newsroom shared between SEN and sister station 3MP 1377 was closed, replaced with the Victorian news service from Macquarie National News, based at 3AW.

In November 2015, it was announced that Francis Leach would depart ABC Grandstand Digital following the axing of the Grandstand Breakfast programme, and will again join SEN, hosting SEN Breakfast alongside David "The Ox" Schwarz to replace The Morning Glory. Current co-host Andy Maher will move to afternoons, launching SEN Lunch Break, moving Daniel Harford into drive with Mark Allen. Andrew Gaze and Tim Watson, while losing regular timeslots, would remain with the station as a contributor.

In January 2018, the station's schedule was again refreshed. Former ABC commentator Gerard Whateley joined the station as chief sports caller and mornings presenter, with Kevin Bartlett moving to the drive show following the departure of Harford. In April 2018, parent company Pacific Star Network merged with sports media business Crocmedia, most notable for producing the AFL Nation broadcast call heard across regional Australia.

In July 2019, SEN has partnered with Crocmedia has purchased 23 narrowband radio licences across Australia including Sydney, Brisbane, Perth, Gold Coast, Darwin and Alice Springs.

Notable announcers

Current announcers

Andrew Gaze
Andrew Hayes
Andy Maher
Anthony Hudson
Ben Graham
Cam Luke
David King
Dermott Brereton
Dwayne Russell
Garry Lyon
Gerard Whateley
Kane Cornes
Kym Dillon
Liam Pickering
Michelangelo Rucci
Nathan Buckley
Peter Vlahos
Sam Edmund
Tim Gossage
Tim Watson

Former announcers

Billy Brownless
Brad Spicer
Bruce Eva
Bryan Martin
Christian Argenti
Daniel Harford
Darren Berry
Darren Parkin
David Schwarz
Francis Leach
Jack Heverin
Jason Richardson
John Rothfield
Hamish McLachlan
Kevin Bartlett
Mark Aiston
Mark Bickley
Mark Doran
Mark Fine
Matthew Primus
Matthew Hardy
Mark Allen
Sam McClure
Terry Wallace
Tony Schibeci
Tristan Foenander

Sports coverage
SEN has exclusive and non-exclusive rights to various sports in Australia:

Australian rules football
Australian Football League
Victorian Football League

Basketball
National Basketball League

Cricket
Australian cricket team in the United Arab Emirates in 2018–19
Big Bash League
Indian cricket team in Australia in 2018–19
2019 Cricket World Cup

Football
A-League

Golf
Australian Open
U.S. Masters Tournament

Horse racing
Spring Racing Carnival
Melbourne Cup
Zipping Classic

Rugby League
State of Origin

Rugby Union
Super Rugby

Tennis
Australian Open

Related stations

SEN SA

On 13 October 2018, SEN parent company Pacific Star Network confirmed it had purchased an AM narrowband licence in Adelaide, South Australia, returning the SEN brand to South Australia. The station launched on 1629 AM on 6 December 2018, with local presenters Kane Cornes, Andrew Hayes, Kym Dillon and Michelangelo Rucci. Other programs, including Gerard Whateley's morning show and live sports coverage, will be syndicated live from the Melbourne station.

On 9 September 2019, SEN SA Breakfast commenced simulcasting on RadioTAB's 1539AM Adelaide frequency. On 2 December, a second South Australian frequency was launched – also on 1629 AM – covering Mount Gambier.

SEN Track

SEN Track is a radio network broadcasting coverage of horse, thoroughbred and greyhound racing, which launched on 28 March 2020.

1170 SEN

1170 SEN (official callsign 2CH) is a sports radio station in Sydney, New South Wales.

SEN Top End
On 17 October 2021 SEN Top End launched on 1611 AM Narrowcast broadcasting coverage of the Northern Territory Football League, horse, thoroughbred and greyhound racing.

SEN Hobart
On 7 July 2021 SEN Hobart launched on 1611 AM Narrowcast providing coverage of several local and national sports such as Cricket, AFL, horse, thoroughbred and greyhound racing.

SEN Gold Coast
On the 3rd March 2021 SEN Gold Coast launched on 1620 AM Narrowcast providing coverage of several local and national sports such as Cricket, AFL, horse, thoroughbred and greyhound racing.

Former stations

SEN 1323
SEN 1323 was launched on 1 February 2005 in Adelaide, replacing 5DN. It largely simulcast 1116 SEN, with a single opt-out program for the Adelaide market. The station closed following parent company Data & Commerce Limited entering voluntary administration in June 2005.

SEN+
SEN+ commenced broadcasting on 13 August 2018, replacing Classic Rock Radio. The station broadcast live coverage of the NFL, NBA, A-League and Super Rugby as well as live and timeshifted programming from the main SEN station.

On 28 March 2020, it was replaced by SEN Track.

Notable programs

Former
No Man Should Ever Walk Alone, a Monday night hour-long show hosted by Danny Frawley on men's health, including mental health (a cause he championed after opening up about his own struggles), addiction and lifestyle. Frawley hosted the show until his death in 2019.

Podcasts
The station also has produced some podcasts, including:
Tiger Tragics, a Richmond-centric podcast hosted by SEN fill-in and weekend host and MCG public address announcer Tony Schibeci and SEN producer's Mitchell Scott and Karl Bianco.
The Carlton Show, a Carlton-centric podcast co-hosted by Maher.
The Geelong Show, a Geelong-centric podcast co-hosted by Ben Casanelia of Inside Football, SEN's AFL magazine.
SEN America, covering American sports leagues such as the NBA.

References

External links
1116 SEN website
Pacific Star Network website

1116 SEN
Radio stations in Melbourne
Radio stations established in 2004
Sports radio stations in Australia